The 2014-15 Turkish Women's Basketball League was the 35th edition of the top-flight professional women's basketball league in Turkey.

Galatasaray OdeaBank were the champions of the season after beating Abdullah Gül Üniversitesi in the playoffs final by 3-1.

Regular season

League table

Play-off 

Source: Turkish Women Basketball League

Individual statistics

Points

Rebounds

Assists

Blocks

Steals

External links 

Turkish Women's Basketball League seasons
Women
Turkey